Emilio Nava was the defending champion but lost in the semifinals to Sergey Fomin.

Fomin won the title after defeating Robin Haase 7–6(7–4), 6–3 in the final.

Seeds

Draw

Finals

Top half

Bottom half

References

External links
Main draw
Qualifying draw

Shymkent Challenger II - 1
2022 Singles